Desiree Marie Velez (born June 8) is an American actress. She was born in Brooklyn, New York. She is the daughter of Inez Torres and Angelo Velez. She has one brother. Her parents are from Puerto Rico.  She has Spanish and Taino native ancestry.  She grew up in Brooklyn, New York, and currently lives in Washington, District of Columbia.  She is a graduate of Mary Washington College in Fredericksburg, Virginia. Her movie credits include Super Mario Brothers and Asunder.  She has appeared in many television shows such as In Our Lives, Matlock, Hack, Ghost Stories, the HBO Oz series, and, most recently, October Road.

External links
Official site
 

Year of birth missing (living people)
Living people
American people of Puerto Rican descent
American people of Spanish descent
American people of Taíno descent
American film actresses
American television actresses
People from Brooklyn
University of Mary Washington alumni
Actresses from New York City
Actresses from Virginia